The Central Military Region (MR M) is a Swedish military region within the Swedish Armed Forces. Established in 2013, the military region staff in based in Kungsängen. The military region includes Dalarna County, Gotland County, Gävleborg County, Stockholm County, Södermanland County, Uppsala County and Västmanland County.

History
The Central Military Region was formed on 1 January 2013 as Military Region Central, as one of four military regions in Sweden. The military region includes Dalarna County, Gotland County, Gävleborg County, Stockholm County, Södermanland County, Uppsala County and Västmanland County. The military region was also responsible for leading the production of the training groups and the Home Guard units in East Middle Sweden. The responsibility involves both training personnel for the Home Guard units and leading them in operations. The Central Military Region's Home Guard battalions are eleven in number. On 1 October 2018, a separate command position was appointed for Military Region Central. From 2019, the name Central Military Region was adopted. From 1 January 2020, all military regions are independent units subordinate to the Chief of Home Guard. In doing so, the regions also take over the command in peacetime from the training groups with their Home Guard battalions. Each military region has production management responsibility. This meant that five training groups were transferred to the Central Military Region. In a government's bill, however, the Swedish government emphasized that the military regional division could be adjusted, depending on the outcome of the investigation Ansvar, ledning och samordning inom civilt försvar ("Responsibility, leadership and coordination in civil defense").

Units

Current units

Södermanlandsgruppen (SMG)
45th Home Guard Battalion
Södertörnsgruppen (STG)
28th Home Guard Battalion/Roslagen Battalion
29th Home Guard Battalion/Södertörn Battalion
Livgardesgruppen (LGG)
23rd Home Guard Battalion/Attundaland Battalion
24th Home Guard Battalion/Stockholm Battalion
25th Home Guard Battalion/Telgehus Battalion
26th Home Guard Battalion/Ulvsunda Battalion
Upplands- och Västmanlandsgruppen (UVG)
21st Home Guard Battalion/Uppland Battalion
22nd Home Guard Battalion/Västmanland Battalion
Gävleborgsgruppen (GBG)
18th Home Guard Battalion/Gävleborg Battalion
Dalregementsgruppen (DRG)
17th Home Guard Battalion/Dalarna Battalion
Gotlandsgruppen (UGG)
32nd Home Guard Battalion/Gotland Battalion

Former units
Forward Command Gotland (Framskjuten ledning Gotland, FLG) was formed on 1 October 2016. It was part of the regional staff in the Central Military Region.

Heraldry and traditions

Coat of arms
Blazon of the coat of arms of the Central Military Region: "Or, the provincial badge of Uppland, an orb azure, banded and ensigned with a cross crosslet, on a chief azur three open crowns fesswise or. The shield surmounting an erect sword or."

Commanding officers
From 2013 to 2017, the military region commander was also commander of the Life Guards. From 2018 to 2020, military region commander was subordinate to the Chief of Joint Operations in territorial activities as well as in operations. Furthermore, the military region commander has territorial responsibility over his own military region and leads territorial activities as well as regional intelligence and security services. From 1 January 2020, all military region commanders are subordinate to the Chief of Home Guard.

2013–2014: Colonel Håkan Hedlund
2014–2017: Colonel Christer Tistam
2017-11-08 – 2022-03-31: Colonel Thomas Karlsson
2022-04-01 – present: Colonel Mattias Ardin

Names, designations and locations

See also
Middle Military District (Milo M)

Footnotes

References

External links
 

Military regions of Sweden
Military units and formations established in 2013
2013 establishments in Sweden
Kungsängen Garrison